The James Townley House is a historic house on the campus of Kean University located at the intersection of Morris Avenue and Green Lane in Union Township, Union County, New Jersey. Built , it was added to the National Register of Historic Places on May 14, 1979, for its significance in architecture.

See also
National Register of Historic Places listings in Union County, New Jersey

References

External links
 
 

Union Township, Union County, New Jersey
National Register of Historic Places in Union County, New Jersey
Houses on the National Register of Historic Places in New Jersey
University and college buildings on the National Register of Historic Places in New Jersey
New Jersey Register of Historic Places
Houses in Union County, New Jersey
Houses completed in 1796
1796 establishments in New Jersey